The Railroad Museum of Pennsylvania is a railroad museum in Strasburg, Lancaster County, Pennsylvania.

The museum is located on the east side of Strasburg along Pennsylvania Route 741.  It is administered by the Pennsylvania Historical and Museum Commission with the active support of the Friends of the Railroad Museum of Pennsylvania (FRM).

The museum's collection has more than 100 historic locomotives and railroad cars that chronicle American railroad history. Visitors can climb aboard various locomotives and cars, inspect a 62-ton locomotive from underneath, view restoration activities via closed-circuit television, enjoy interactive educational programs, and more.

The Railroad Museum of Pennsylvania was created to provide a historical account of railroading in Pennsylvania by preserving rolling stock, artifacts, and archives of railroad companies of the Commonwealth. However, the museum has branched out over the years, acquiring some pieces that are not directly related to Pennsylvania, but are important to the history of railroading.

In addition to full-size rolling stock pieces, the museum offers a number of other commodities, which include several model railroad layouts, a hands-on educational center, a library and archives, and a smaller exhibit gallery on the second floor.

Building and grounds
The initial display building opened in 1975 as the first building constructed to be a railroad museum, and featured an operating turntable from the Reading Company.  The original building was roughly 45,000 square feet in size and included an observation bridge leading across Rolling Stock Hall, allowing visitors to see the trains from above. In June 1995, Rolling Stock Hall was enlarged to 100,000 square feet.

Today, the Railroad Museum of Pennsylvania covers 18 acres. This includes Rolling Stock Hall, a second floor changing-exhibit gallery, an observation bridge, a hands-on education center called Stewart Junction, an extensive library and archives, a restoration and paint shop, and an outdoor storage and display yard. Rolling Stock Hall and the second floor are both handicapped accessible. The yard is subject to weather closure.

A newly designed entrance and gift shop were opened in June 2007.  Some larger or more modern engines and cars are displayed outdoors, and a new roundhouse to store some of the larger locomotives is to be built in the near future.

The National Toy Train Museum, & Choo Choo Barn are located nearby, and the Strasburg Rail Road is across the street from the museum.

History

For the 1939-1940 New York World's Fair, the Pennsylvania Railroad had displayed a number of historic locomotives and cars they had collected over the years. After the fair had ended, the PRR, decided to preserve the equipment that was displayed, along with various other locomotives and rolling stock. The equipment was stored away in a roundhouse in Northumberland, Pennsylvania, and looked after by employees.

With the state looking to establish a railroad museum and PRR successor Penn Central looking to rid itself of the collection in the late 1960s, it was decided the museum was to be built directly next to the Strasburg Rail Road in Strasburg, Pennsylvania. The engines were moved to the Strasburg Rail Road, where they were stored while the museum was under construction. A large number of the Pennsylvania Railroad's Historic Collection was sent to Strasburg coupled together, forming the "Train of Trains."

The Railroad Museum of Pennsylvania was officially opened to the public April 1, 1975. As the museum acquired more equipment, they required more space, so in 1995, Rolling Stock Hall was expanded by 55,000 square feet. Today, the museum covers 18 acres of land, including 100,000 square feet indoors. A roundhouse for the larger locomotives that are currently stored outside was planned for 2018 but had not broken ground as-of January 2019. In all, the museum holds roughly 100 pieces of rolling stock, some nearing 200 years old.

Collection

Locomotives 
The collection is made up of more than a hundred historic locomotives and cars, many of which are part of the historical collection of the Pennsylvania Railroad. Following the 1939-1940 New York World's Fair, the PRR placed many of their historic rolling stock aside for preservation. The collection was stored in a roundhouse in Northumberland, Pennsylvania. In 1969, the collection was relocated from Northumberland to Strasburg, where they were stored at the Strasburg Rail Road until the museum's completion in 1975.

Some of these engines had operated on the Strasburg Railroad for a number of years before being put back on display. PRR 1223, famous for its use in the 1969 film Hello, Dolly!, and PRR 7002 (originally #8063), a re-creation of the famous original PRR #7002, which set an unofficial land speed record in 1905 by traveling at 127.1 miles per hour. Both were leased to the Strasburg Rail Road, and retired permanently in 1989.

Other historic locomotives are featured at the museum, including the famous "Lindbergh Engine", PRR 460, which completed a 6-year cosmetic restoration November, 2016, and the oldest PRR locomotive #1187, built in 1888. The 1187 is placed over a pit, so visitors may go underneath and see the locomotive's underside. #1187 got into an accident in 1895 and was barely damaged from the incident, but the smoke box had to be rebuilt and the rebuilt smoke box is still on the locomotive to this day. The official steam locomotive of the Commonwealth of Pennsylvania PRR 3750, famous for pulling President Warren Harding's funeral train, is on display outside of the museum. Two replicas are also included in the Pennsylvania Historic Collection, the John Bull (orig. built 1831) and the John Stevens (orig. built 1825).

Other locomotives in the collection include two PRR GG1 locomotives, the original prototype PRR 4800 and the PRR #4935, Amtrak E60 #603, and the Tahoe, a 2-6-0 built in 1875 for use on the Virginia & Truckee Railroad. They also have two fireless steam locomotives (Bethlehem Steel #111 and Pennsylvania Power & Light #4094-D), and examples of the three most common geared locomotives: a Shay locomotive (Leetonia Railway #1), a Heisler locomotive (Chicago Mill & Lumber Company #4), and a Climax locomotive (W. H. Mason Company #1).

The museum's most recent acquisition is Amtrak AEM-7 number 915, donated by Amtrak in 2015.

Cars 
The museum also has a large collection of rail cars. Many of these are examples of cars seen on the Pennsylvania Railroad, including a P70 passenger car, a B60 Baggage car, and an N5c caboose. There are also several wood bodied freight and passenger cars. Also on display is PRR 1651, one of the first all-steel passenger cars.

Other
The Railroad Museum of Pennsylvania has a Solari board listing train departure times that was formerly used at Amtrak's 30th Street Station in Philadelphia on static display. The board, created by Solari di Udine, was the last such one at an Amtrak station. It was used until January 26, 2019, when it was removed and replaced with a digital board. The Solari board from 30th Street Station has been on static display at the museum since July 2019.

List of locomotives

See also

List of heritage railroads in the United States

References

External links
Railroad Museum of Pennsylvania website

Railroad museums in Pennsylvania
Museums established in 1975
Museums in Lancaster County, Pennsylvania